A TeachMeet is an organised but informal meeting (in the style of an unconference) for teachers to share good practice, practical innovations and personal insights in teaching. These events are often organised to coincide with other educational events like the Scottish Learning Festival and the British Educational Technology and Training Show BETT.

Participants volunteer (via each TeachMeet's event website) to demonstrate good practice they've delivered over the past year, or discuss a product that enhances classroom practice.

TeachMeet events are open to all, do not charge an entry fee, and take place in a social setting.

History
Originally conceived in the summer of 2006 in Edinburgh, Scotland, under the name "ScotEduBlogs Meetup". The new name, TeachMeet, was created by Ewan McIntosh and agreed upon by the attendees of the first event. The 2nd Edition was held in Glasgow on 20 September 2006.

The 5th TeachMeet was the first to be held at the BETT Show in London.

In 2010 TeachMeet 'Takeover' was introduced at BETT, where teachers took over vendors stands in the main conference to bring the TeachMeet discussion out of the Apex Room and onto the exhibition floor.

In 2017 the Malaysian TeachMeets decided to make all presentations 2 minutes to make it a quicker format.

TeachMeets are now regular occurrences in Scotland, England, Northern Ireland, Australia, Canada, Croatia, Czech Republic, Denmark, Ireland, Malaysia, Sweden, the USA, New Zealand.
In New Zealand the TeachMeet is virtual and is run totally via Google+ Hangout.
Since global travel restrictions were put in place in March 2020, many TeachMeets have been convened using online platforms.

Common features
The following features are often part of a Teachmeet, but the format changes according to the size of the meeting and the preferences of the organisers:
 Micro-presentations - lasting 7 minutes
 Nano-presentations - lasting 2 minutes nano presentation (3-5 one after the other)
 Round-table break-outs - lasting 15 minutes or so, allowing focussed discussion around a theme, with a volunteer facilitator
 Random selection of speakers - from a pool of willing participants
 Backchannel - to let non-attendees participate or follow proceedings that are broadcast on social media timelines

Reference list

External links
 TeachMeet in Ireland
 Teachmeet at Wikispaces.com (USA)
 http://www.teachmeetnz.wikispaces.com/ (NZ)
 TeachMeet in Scotland - new site
 The Evolution of TeachMeet - a simple timeline
Ongoing research into TeachMeet
TeachMeet Kuala Lumpur

Educational technology academic and professional associations
Education in the United Kingdom
Unconferences